Baron Templemore, of Templemore in the County of Donegal, is a title in the Peerage of the United Kingdom, since 1975 a subsidiary title of the Marquessate of Donegall. It was created on 10 September 1831 for Arthur Chichester, Member of Parliament for Milborne Port and County Wexford. He was the son of Lord Spencer Stanley Chichester, third son of The 1st Marquess of Donegall (see Marquess of Donegall for earlier history of the Chichester family). Lord Templemore's son, the second Baron, and grandson, the third Baron, both served as Deputy Lieutenants of County Wexford. The latter was succeeded by his eldest son, the fourth Baron. He served as the Government Chief Whip in the House of Lords between 1940 and 1945. He was succeeded by his second but eldest surviving son, the fifth Baron. In 1975 he succeeded his kinsman as seventh Marquess of Donegall. For further history of the titles, see Marquess of Donegall.

Two other members of this branch of the Chichester family may also be mentioned. The Honourable Augustus George Charles Chichester (1822–1896), second son of the first Baron, was a Lieutenant-General in the 77th Foot. The Honourable Sir Gerald Henry Crofton Chichester (1886–1939), second son of the third Baron, was private secretary to Queen Mary between 1935 and 1939.

Despite the geographical designation "Templemore in the County of Donegal", in 1831 the civil parish of Templemore was entirely in County Londonderry rather than in neighbouring County Donegal. The name "Templemore" originally designated the medieval cathedral of Derry, and later the parish west of the River Foyle served by the cathedral. A 1613 charter included the portion of the parish nearest the renamed city of Londonderry within the city's northwest liberties and the new County Londonderry. Subsequently the County Donegal portion of Templemore was made into separate parishes (Muff, Burt, and Inch).

Barons Templemore (1831)

Arthur Chichester, 1st Baron Templemore (1797–1837)
Harry Spencer Chichester, 2nd Baron Templemore (1821–1906)
Arthur Henry Chichester, 3rd Baron Templemore (1854–1924)
Arthur Claud Spencer Chichester, 4th Baron Templemore (1880–1953)
Dermot Richard Claud Chichester, 5th Baron Templemore (1916–2007) (succeeded as 7th Marquess of Donegall in 1975)
For further succession, see Marquess of Donegall

References

External links

Chichester family
Baronies in the Peerage of the United Kingdom
Noble titles created in 1831
Noble titles created for UK MPs